Dardan Dreshaj (born 4 August 1992) is a Norwegian football striker who plays for Trauma.

Of Kosovan descent, his parents migrated to Norway in 1990. Dreshaj was born in Levanger, but grew up in Mandal. After playing youth and B team football for Mandalskameratene and Start he made his debut for Start in the 2011 Eliteserien game against Haugesund, scoring Start's only goal. The next year he got league 7 games, now in the 2012 1. divisjon. From 2013 to 2016 he spent one season each in Flekkerøy, Fram, Arendal and Follo, always scoring double figures in league and cup combined. In 2017 he rejoined Flekkerøy and scored 24 goals in 25 league games.

References

1992 births
Living people
People from Levanger
People from Mandal, Norway
Norwegian people of Kosovan descent
Norwegian footballers
IK Start players
Flekkerøy IL players
IF Fram Larvik players
Arendal Fotball players
Follo FK players
Eliteserien players
Norwegian First Division players
Association football forwards
Sportspeople from Agder